The Colquitt County School District is a public school district in Colquitt County, Georgia and based in Moultrie. It serves the communities of Berlin, Doerun, Ellenton, Funston, Moultrie, Norman Park, Omega, and Riverside.

Schools

The Colquitt County School District has eleven elementary schools, two middle schools, and  one high school.

Elementary schools
Cox Elementary School
Doerun Elementary School
Funston Elementary School
Hamilton Elementary School
Norman Park Elementary School
Odom Elementary School
Okapilco Elementary School
Stringfellow Elementary School
Sunset Elementary School
Wright Elementary School
Gear Elementary School

Middle schools
Willie J. Williams Middle School
C.A. Gray Jr High School

High school
Colquitt County High School is the current school.  The former Moultrie High School building, in Moultrie, is listed on the National Register of Historic Places.

References

External links

School districts in Georgia (U.S. state)
Education in Colquitt County, Georgia